RadioJoyAlukkas.com is an internet radio website in Malayalam language, operated by the Joy Alukkas group. The website started functioning from November 6, 2007.

The radio has 24/7 entertainment, live breaking news times, interviews with celebrities, shows anchored by film and television stars besides comedy shows hosted by Comedians. Good Morning Kerala open the day's proceedings followed by news time. 'Hello Joy Alukkas' is the popular program in the channel anchored by Asha Latha and Balakrishnan. It is one of the front line internet radio in Malayalam. The radio brings songs in Tamil and Hindi as well.

The RadioJoyAlukkas operates its service from Dubai Media City. It is registered under Joyalukkas, Dubai, a company dealing in the wholesale and retail marketing of Diamonds and Gold.

References

External links
 

Internet radio in India
2007 establishments in the United Arab Emirates
Radio stations established in 2007